Jennings may refer to the following places in the U.S. state of Maryland:
Jennings, Anne Arundel County, Maryland, an unincorporated community
Jennings, Garrett County, Maryland, an unincorporated community and census-designated place